Catalan Grimaldi (Catalano Grimaldi) (c. 1415–1457) was Lord of Monaco from 1454 until 1457.

Sources 

1415 births
1457 deaths
15th-century Lords of Monaco
House of Grimaldi
Lords of Monaco
People of Ligurian descent